Jan-Marc Jouas is a retired United States Air Force lieutenant general. He served as the Deputy Commander, United Nations Command Korea; Deputy Commander, United States Forces Korea; Commander, Air Component Command, Republic of Korea/United States Combined Forces Command; and Commander, Seventh Air Force, Pacific Air Forces, Osan Air Base, South Korea. He was also the United States representative to the joint committee for the Status of Forces agreement between the two countries. He retired on February 1, 2015.

Military career
Jouas was commissioned in 1979 as a graduate of the United States Air Force Academy. He is a command pilot with extensive operational experience in F-4, F-15 and F-16 aircraft, including more than 80 combat missions. He has commanded at the squadron, group and wing levels, and served as a Joint Staff division chief and special assistant to the Chairman of the Joint Chiefs of Staff. Prior to his current assignment, he was the Pacific Air Forces Director of Operations, Plans, Requirements, and Programs.

Commander of the Seventh Air Force
Jouas saw the Seventh Air Force's mission as "to deter aggression and maintain the armistice, defend the Republic of Korea, and defeat any attack against the alliance". He has stated that the Seventh Air Force is capable of flying up to 3,000 sorties per day in support of United States Forces Korea during combat operations. During a July 2012 incident between Town Patrol personnel and several Korean nationals, Jouas was praised for his rapid and diplomatic response to the incident, which was credited with reducing tension and minimizing the impact of the incident on South Korea-United States relations.
As commander, Jouas had a "zero tolerance policy" toward prostitution and human trafficking. In summer of 2013, Jouas placed the notorious "Juicy" bars in the Songtan Entertainment District off-limits to Seventh Air Force personnel. Jouas commented on the Juicy bars, "There's nothing good about them. I think they further an attitude toward women that's unacceptable. There are a lot of our servicemembers that don't want to go into those bars because they're pretty creepy."

Education
 1979 Bachelor of Science degree in international affairs, U.S. Air Force Academy, Colorado Springs, Colorado
 1984 Squadron Officer School, by correspondence
 1984 Master of Arts degree in education, Chapman College, Calif.
 1987 Air Command and Staff College, by seminar
 1992 Army Command and General Staff College, Fort Leavenworth, Kan.
 1998 Fellow, Harvard University Center for International Affairs, Cambridge, Mass.
 2002 Senior Executive Fellowship, Kennedy School of Government, Cambridge, Mass.

Assignments
1. June 1979 – October 1980, student, undergraduate pilot training, Vance AFB, Okla. 
2. January 1981 – December 1981, student, F-4E/F-4G combat crew training, George AFB, Calif. 
3. December 1981 – May 1984, F-4G pilot, George AFB, Calif. 
4. May 1984 – August 1988, F-4G instructor pilot/weapons officer, Spangdahlem Air Base, West Germany 
5. August 1988 – June 1991, ops inspector, Tactical Air Command Inspector General, Langley AFB, Va. 
6. June 1991 – August 1992, student, Army Command and General Staff College, Fort Leavenworth, Kan. 
7. August 1992 – January 1995, F-4G instructor pilot, assistant operations officer, Nellis AFB, Nev
8. January 1995 – August 1995, Chief, 57th Wing Flying Safety, Nellis AFB, Nev. 
9. August 1995 – June 1997, Commander, 422nd Test and Evaluation Squadron, Nellis AFB, Nev. 
10. July 1997 – June 1998, Fellow, Harvard University Center for International Affairs, Cambridge, Mass. 
11. August 1998 – March 2000, Commander, 52nd Operations Group, Spangdahlem AB, Germany 
12. April 2000 – March 2002, Chief, Western Europe and NATO Policy Division (J5), Joint Staff, the Pentagon, Washington, D.C. 
13. March 2002 – September 2002, special assistant to the Chairman of the Joint Chiefs of Staff, the Pentagon, Washington, D.C. 
14. October 2002 – June 2004, Commander, 354th Fighter Wing, Eielson AFB, Alaska 
15. June 2004 – January 2006, Commander, 18th Wing, Kadena AB, Japan 
16. January 2006 – May 2007, Vice Commander, Air Intelligence Agency, Lackland AFB, Texas 
17. May 2007 – July 2008, Vice Commander, Air Force Intelligence, Surveillance and Reconnaissance Agency, Lackland AFB, Texas 
18. July 2008 – September 2008, special assistant to Commander, Pacific Air Forces, Hickam AFB, Hawaii 
19. September 2008 – December 2011, Director, Operations, Plans, Requirements and Programs, Headquarters Pacific Air Forces, Hickam AFB, Hawaii
20. January 2012 – January 2015, Deputy Commander, United Nations Command Korea; Deputy Commander, U.S. Forces Korea; Commander, Air Component Command, Republic of Korea/U.S. Combined Forces Command; and Commander, 7th Air Force, Pacific Air Forces, Osan AB, South Korea

Flight information
Rating: Command pilot
Flight hours: More than 3,100
Aircraft flown: F-4, F-15, F-16.

Awards and decorations

Effective dates of promotion
 United States Air Force Academy Cadet – Class of 1979

References

External links
 http://monthly.chosun.com/client/news/viw.asp?ctcd=E&nNewsNumb=201409100027 [Interview with South Korea Media, Monthly Chosun]
 http://pub.chosun.com/client/news/viw.asp?cate=C02&mcate=M1001&nNewsNumb=20150216662&nidx=16663 [Interview with South Korea Media, Chosun News Press]

Living people
United States Air Force Academy alumni
United States Air Force generals
Year of birth missing (living people)
Recipients of the Defense Distinguished Service Medal
Recipients of the Air Force Distinguished Service Medal
Recipients of the Defense Superior Service Medal
Recipients of the Legion of Merit